The Kabalian (Cabalian) language, Kinabalian, is spoken in the municipality of San Juan in the province of Southern Leyte in the Philippines. It is closely related to Waray-Waray.

Native speakers refer to the language as Cabalianon or Kinabalianon. This language shares certain characteristics with Cebuano, Boholano, and Surigaonon mainly because of the seafaring livelihood of pre-Hispanic inhabitants of Cabalian, documented by Spanish explorers. Waray did not make inroads into the southern portion of Leyte because of the mountains separating the north and south portions of the island. This is coherent under the principle of mountains divide; seas unite in the spread of Philippine languages.

The heaviest influence on Cabalianon is Surigaonon, owing to the contact between Cabalian and Surigao in the early Spanish period.

Kabalian (la) is spoken in six villages in San Juan (Cabalian) town, Southern Leyte Province. These barangays are located in the eastern portion of the town. The predominance of Cabalianon in this side of the town is due to the fact that migrants from Cebu and Bohol settled in the western portion of the town, particularly Pong-oy, as well as in Himatagon, the business hub of Saint Bernard, formerly a part of Cabalian, resulting in the gradual disappearance of the language in these parts.

Although Kabalian is a Warayan language, it has mixed elements of Boholano, Cebuano and Surigaonon, a similar pattern which is also found in Baybayanon. However, Kabalian is not mutually intelligible with either Waray-Waray, Boholano, Cebuano or Surigaonon. Kabalian speakers do not ethnically or linguistically identify themselves with speakers of either of these languages.

Vocabulary

Interrogatives
 Who?
 To whom?
 What?
 How? (past)
 How? (future)
 Where? (for person or object)
 Where? (for place)
 Where? (for directions or origin)
 When?
 Why?
 Really?
 How much?

They have distinct uses in Kabalianon.

 is used when asking about a person or object.

 (Where is Papa?)
 (Where was the scissor put?)

 is used when asking about a place.
 (Where are we going to?)
 (Where are you going?)

 is used when asking about directions or origin.
 (Where is this place?)
 (Where are you from?)
 (Where were you?)

Phrases and vocabulary
 (Hello)
 (Good morning)
 (Good noon)
 (Good afternoon)
 (Good evening or good night)
 (Good day)
 (Goodbye)
 (Take care)
 (Thank you)
 (Don't)
 (Nothing)
 (No)
 (Yes)
 (Maybe)
 (I don't know)

Comparison between Cabalianon, Surigaonon, Cebuano, and Waray

References

Visayan languages
Languages of Southern Leyte